Khalid Farooqi is an Afghan parliamentarian from Paktika Province and leader of Hezb-e-Islami Khalid Farooqi. He is well known for fighting against French and Afghani forces.

References

Living people
Hezb-e-Islami Khalid Farooqi politicians
People from Paktika Province
Year of birth missing (living people)
Place of birth missing (living people)
21st-century Afghan politicians